Agha Shorish Kashmiri  (1917–1975) was a Pakistani scholar, writer, debater, and a leader of the Majlis-e-Ahrar-e-Islam party. He was a figure of the freedom movement in the British Raj, as well as the chief editor of the weekly Chattan magazine in Pakistan.

Early life and career
Kashmiri started his political career in 1935 when he delivered a historical speech at the Shaheed Ganj Mosque conference when Maulana Zafar Ali Khan was serving as the President of Ahrar Party, India. He was a student of Maulana Zafar Ali Khan but was disappointed by the violence at the Shaheed Ganj Mosque in 1935.

Kashmiri was impressed by Chaudhry Afzal Haq as well, who was a political leader of the Indian sub-continent, so he joined All-India Majlis-e-Ahrar-e-Islam and the struggle for Ahrar Party. Kashmiri was also impressed by his religious and political teacher (teacher meaning murshad in the Urdu language) Ameer-e-Shariyyat Syed Ata Ullah Shah Bukhari.

Kashmiri was elected as Secretary-General of All-India Majlis-e-Ahrar-e-Islam in 1946. He played a role in Tehreek-e-Khatme Nabuwwat in 1974 during Zulfiqar Ali Bhutto's regime in Pakistan.
In 2014, the Punjab governor in Pakistan, Chaudhry Muhammad Sarwar was speaking at a book-launching ceremony in Lahore. This book was written about the late Agha Shorish Kashmiri's life. The Punjab governor said that he was a great journalist who had exposed oppression everywhere. Journalists today can learn a lot from him. The governor said that Maulana Zafar Ali Khan's influence was reflected in Kashmiri's writings and Attaullah Shah Bukhari's influence in Kashmiri's speech.

Books
Qaid-i farang, Maulānā Ẓafar ʻAlī K̲h̲ān̲ ke ayām-i asīrī, on Zafar Ali Khan قیدِ فرنگ -مولانا ظفر علی خان کے ایامِ اسیری
Kulliyyāt-i Shorish Kāshmīrī, کُلیاتِ شورش کاشمیری  his poetry collection
Iqbāl aur Qādiyāniyat,  اِقبال اور قادیانیات on the relations between Muhammad Iqbal and the Ahmadiyya
al-Jihād va al-jihād  الجِہاد والجِہاد , poetry about the 1965 Indo-Pakistan war
Iqbal, payāmbar-i inqilāb اقبال پیامبرِ اِنقلاب , Collection of addresses and articles about Muhammad Iqbal
Hindustān men̲ Ibn-i Taymiyah ہندوستان میں ابن تیمیہ, author's reminiscences on the life and eminence of Abul Kalam Azad
Qalmī cihre قلمی چہرے, articles chiefly on literary and political personalities from South Asia
Tahrik i khatm-i nubūvvat, 1891 se 1974 tak تحریکِ ختمِ نبوّت ۱۸۹۱ سے ۱۹۷۴ تک, on the history of the movement defending the finality of prophet-hood (1891-1947)
Cih qalandarānah guftam, چہ قلندراں گفتم poetry
Nau ratan : Lāhaur ke nau ṣaḥāfiyon̲ kā ijmālī taz̲kirah   نو رتن: لاھور کے نو صحافیوں کا اجمالی تذکرہ, biographical study of nine journalists from Lahore
Maẓāmīn-i Shorish مضامینِ شورش : Āg̲h̲ā Shorish Kāshmīrī kī g̲h̲air mudavvin adabī aur tāʼas̲s̲urātī taḥrīren̲ آغا شورش کاشمیری کی غیر مدون ادبی اور تاثراتی تحریریں, collection of literary articles by the author
Mirzāʻīl; Qādiyāniyat kā siyāsī maḥāsabah مِرزائیل؛ قادیانیت کی سیاسی مہا بھاشا, on the Ahmadiyya
Iqbāliyāt-i Shorish اِقبالیاتِ شورش , criticism and interpretation on the works of Muhammad Iqbal
Sayyid ʻAt̤āʼullāh Shāh Bukhārī : savāniḥ va afkār سید عطاء اللہ شاہ بُخاری: سوانح و افکار, on the life and work of Syed Ata Ullah Shah Bukhari
Abūlkalām Āzād : savāniḥ o afkārابوالکلام آزاد: سوانح و افکار , on the life and works of Abul Kalam Azad
Buay Gul Nala-E-Dil Dood-E-Charagh-E-Mehfil by Shorish Kashmiri
Pase Diwar E Zindan by Shorish Kashmiri

References

Pakistani editors
Pakistani male journalists
Pakistani scholars
Pakistani writers
1917 births
1975 deaths
Pakistani people of Kashmiri descent
People from Lahore
Critics of Ahmadiyya
Pakistani prisoners and detainees
Secretary Generals of Majlis-e-Ahrar-ul-Islam